The Oyster Bowl is a regular season college football game played annually in the Hampton Roads-area of Virginia. The game has featured match-ups between high school, NCAA Division III, and at present, NCAA Division I teams, at various points in its existence. It is sponsored by the Norfolk, Virginia-based Khedive Temple of the Shriners, with a portion of the revenue going to children's charity. The 2018 Oyster Bowl was the 69th edition of the game; ODU defeated VMI 77–14, in the final game at Foreman Field.

During the first incarnation of the Oyster Bowl, it was held at Foreman Field in Norfolk, Virginia, and with one exception, featured NCAA major college teams. The inaugural Oyster Bowl was held in 1946 between two high schools, the local Granby Comets and the Clifton Mustangs of Clifton, New Jersey.

After a one-year break, the game was resumed in 1948 and played continuously until 1995. At that time, the Oyster Bowl was discontinued for financial reasons. The series of games from 1946 to 1995 generated more than $3 million for the Shriners Hospitals for Children.

During the 1977 edition between East Carolina and William & Mary, former East Carolina head coach Jim Johnson, who was attending the game as a spectator, tackled a William & Mary player about to score the game-winning touchdown. Many well known players participated in the Oyster Bowl during the time it featured Division I teams. These include Ernie Davis of Syracuse, Don Meredith of SMU, Bruce Smith of Virginia Tech, Roger Staubach of Navy, Fran Tarkenton of Georgia, and Randy White of Maryland.

In 1999, the game was revived and relocated to the Joseph S. Darling Memorial Stadium in nearby Hampton, Virginia where the Oyster Bowl now featured a match-up between Division III college teams.

In 2011, it was announced that the Oyster Bowl would return to Foreman Field and feature Division I schools once again. Old Dominion University hosted James Madison University in 2011.  The Fightin' Blue Hens from the University of Delaware played ODU in 2012. Since ODU joined Conference USA (C-USA) football in 2014 (the school had been a full but non-football C-USA member in the 2013 season), each edition of the game featured ODU and a C-USA opponent until they joined the Sun Belt Conference in 2022.

Game results

References

College football bowls
American football in Virginia
Recurring sporting events established in 1946
1946 establishments in Virginia